Frankfurt Airport (also known as Rhein-Main-Flughafen) is Germany's main international airport by passenger numbers and is located in Frankfurt, the fifth-largest city of Germany and one of the world's leading financial centres. It is operated by Fraport and serves as the main hub for Lufthansa, including Lufthansa CityLine and Lufthansa Cargo as well as Condor and AeroLogic.

Frankfurt Airport is the busiest airport by passenger traffic in Germany as well as the 4th busiest in Europe after London–Heathrow, Paris–Charles de Gaulle and Amsterdam Airport Schiphol. The airport is also the 13th busiest worldwide by total number of passengers in 2016, with 60.786 million passengers using the airport in 2016. In 2017, Frankfurt Airport handled 64.5 million passengers and nearly 70 million in 2018. It also had a freight throughput of 2.076 million metric tonnes in 2015 and is the busiest airport in Europe by cargo traffic. As of summer 2017, Frankfurt Airport serves more than 300 destinations in 5 continents, making it the airport with the most direct routes in the world.

The southern side of the airport ground was home to the Rhein-Main Air Base, which was a major air base for the United States from 1947 until 2005, when the air base was closed and the property was acquired by Fraport (now occupied by Terminal 3).  The airport celebrated its 80th anniversary in July 2016.

Location
The airport grounds, which form a city district of Frankfurt named Frankfurt-Flughafen, are surrounded by the Frankfurt City Forest. The southern portion of the airport grounds extend partially into the cities of Rüsselsheim am Main and Mörfelden-Walldorf, and a western portion of the grounds lie within the city of Kelsterbach.

The airport is centrally located in the Frankfurt/Rhine-Main region, Germany's third-largest metropolitan region, which itself has a central location in the densely populated region of the west-central European megalopolis. Thereby, along with a strong rail and motorway connection, the airport serves as a major transport node for the greater region, less than two hours by ground to Cologne, the Ruhr Area, and Stuttgart.

History

First airport
On 16 November 1909, the world's first airline was founded in Frankfurt am Main: The Deutsche Luftschiffahrts-Aktiengesellschaft (DELAG). DELAG then built the first airport in Frankfurt, called Airship Base at Rebstock, which was located in Bockenheim in the western part of the city and was primarily used for airships in the beginning. It opened in 1912 and was extended after World War I, but in 1924, an expert's report already questioned the possibility of further expansions at this location.

With the foundation of Deutsche Luft Hansa in 1926, a rapid boom of civilian air travel started, and soon the airship base became too small to handle the demand. Plans for a new and larger airport located in the Frankfurt City Forest south-west of Schwanheim were approved in 1930 but were not realized due to the Great Depression. After the Machtergreifung in 1933, the government revived the plans and started the construction of the new airport.

Second airport

A two-storey station building with a six-storey tower originated in 1935 on the northern part of the airport, as well as other operating and outbuildings for maintenance and storage of aircraft. The approximately 100 hectares runway received a grass cover.

The official opening of the new  Flug- und Luftschiffhafen Rhein-Main took place on 8 July 1936. The first plane that landed was a Ju 52/3m. Six days later, on 14 July 1936, LZ 127 Graf Zeppelin landed at the airport. In 1936, 800 tons of cargo and 58,000 passengers were transported, and in 1937 these figures increased to 70,000 passengers and 966 tons of cargo. In the coming years, the new airport was the home base for the two largest German airships, LZ 127 Graf Zeppelin and LZ 129 Hindenburg. In 1938, Frankfurt was a central distribution point for the transport of airmail to North America.

On 6 May 1937, the Hindenburg, flying from Frankfurt to New York, exploded shortly before it was scheduled to dock at Lakehurst. 36 people died. The accident marked the end of scheduled airship traffic and the end of the airship era.

World War II
After the beginning of World War II in 1939, all foreign airlines left the airport, and control of air traffic was transferred to the Luftwaffe. 

The airships were dismantled and their huge hangars demolished on 6 May 1940 during conversion of the base to military use. Luftwaffe engineers subsequently extended the single runway, and erected hangars and other facilities for German military aircraft.

On 9 May 1940, the first bombers took off to attack France. From August to November 1944, a concentration camp was established in Walldorf, close to the airport site, where Jewish female prisoners were forced to work for the airport. The Allies of World War II destroyed the runway system with airstrikes in 1944, and the Wehrmacht blew up buildings and fuel depots in 1945, shortly before the US Army took control of the airport on 25 March 1945. After the German Instrument of Surrender, the war in Europe ended and the US Army started to build a new temporary runway at Frankfurt Airport. The southern part of the airport ground was occupied to build the Rhein-Main Air Base as an Air Force Base for the United States Air Forces in Europe.

Berlin Airlift

In 1948, the Soviet Union blocked the Western Allies' rail and road access to the sectors of West Berlin under Allied control. Their aim was to force the western powers to allow the Soviet zone to start supplying Berlin with food and fuel, thereby giving the Soviets practical control over the entire city. In response, the Western Allies organised the Berlin Airlift to carry supplies via air to the people in West Berlin. The airports in Frankfurt, Hamburg and Hannover were the primary bases for Allied aircraft. The heavy use of these so-called "Raisin Bombers" caused damage to the runway in Frankfurt and forced the US Army to build a second parallel runway. The airlift ended in September 1949 after the Soviet Union ended their blockade.

Growth of the airport

In 1951, restrictions for German air travellers were lifted and civil air traffic started to grow again. In 1952, Frankfurt Airport handled more than 400,000 passengers; a year later it was more than half a million. About 100 to 120 aeroplanes took off from and landed in Frankfurt daily. In 1955, Lufthansa resumed flights to and from Frankfurt and in the same year the Federal Republic of Germany gained its air sovereignty back from the Allies.

The airport did not emerge as a major international airline hub until 1958 when a new passenger terminal called Empfangsanlage Ost (Terminal East, literally "Arrival Facility East") opened in the north-east corner of the airport site. Only four years later it was clear that the terminal was already too small for the demand. In 1961, Frankfurt already had 2.2 million passengers and 81,000 take-offs and landings, making it the second busiest airport in Europe behind Heathrow Airport, London.

In 1962, it was decided to build an even larger terminal with a capacity of 30 million passengers per year. Work on this terminal began in 1965. In 1970, a new hangar was inaugurated; this accommodated six jet aircraft and was the world's largest hangar at the time.

The new main terminal
The new terminal, called Terminal Mitte (Central Terminal, today known as Terminal 1) is divided into three concourses (A, B and C) with 56 gates and an electric baggage handling system. Everything opened to the public on 14 March 1972. It was assumed that the terminal capacity would be sufficient for the next 30 years. Along with the new terminal a railway station (Frankfurt Airport station) was opened, the first airport railway station in the Federal Republic of Germany. A few days later the old Empfangsanlage Ost was closed.

The third runway
Planning for a third runway (called Startbahn 18 West) began in 1973. This project spawned massive protests by residents and environmentalists. The main points of conflict were increasing noise and pollution and the cutting down of protected trees in the Frankfurt City Forest. While the protests and related lawsuits were unsuccessful in preventing construction, the Startbahn West protests were one of the major crystallisation points for the German environmental movement of the 1980s. The protests even continued after the runway had been opened in 1984 and in 1987 two police officers were killed by a gunman. This incident ended the Startbahn West protests for good. Because of its orientation in the north–south direction, in contrast to the other east–west runways, the use of the third runway is limited. The Startbahn West can only be used for takeoffs to the south to avoid interference with air traffic on the other runways. Owing to this restriction the runway must be partially or fully closed when northward winds are too strong.

Terminal 2 and the second railway station

In 1990, work on a new terminal (Terminal 2) began because it was anticipated that Terminal Mitte would reach its capacity limit sooner than expected. The new terminal, divided into concourses D and E, was built to the east of the existing terminal where once the Empfangsanlage Ost had been. With its opening in 1994, Frankfurt Airport increased its terminal capacity to 54 million passengers per year. Along with the terminal opening, a people mover system called Sky Line was established to provide a fast connection between Terminal 2 and Terminal Mitte (now renamed Terminal 1).

In 1999 a second railway station, primarily for InterCityExpress long-distance trains (called Frankfurt Airport long-distance station), opened near Terminal 1 as part of the new Cologne–Frankfurt high-speed rail line. At the same time local and regional rail services were based at the existing underground station, now renamed Frankfurt Airport regional station.

Closure of the Rhein-Main Air Base
On 30 December 2005, the Rhein-Main Air Base in the southern part of the airport ground was closed and the US Air Force moved to Ramstein Air Base. The property was handed back to Fraport which allows the airport to use it to build a new passenger terminal. The property of the housing area for the soldiers, called Gateway Gardens, which was located north-east of the airport site, was given back to the city of Frankfurt in the same year and will be developed as a business district in the following years.

The Airbus A380 and The Squaire
From 2005 to 2007, a large Airbus A380 maintenance facility was built at Frankfurt Airport because Lufthansa wanted to station their future A380 aircraft fleet there. Both terminals also underwent major renovations in order to handle the A380, including the installation of a third boarding bridge at several gates. Lufthansa's first Airbus A380 went into operation in June 2010 and was named Frankfurt am Main.

In 2011, a large office building called The Squaire (a blend of square and air) opened at Frankfurt Airport. It was built on top of the Airport long-distance station and is considered the largest office building in Germany with  floor area. Main tenants are KPMG and two Hilton Hotels.

Since 2012, the people mover "The Squaire Metro" connects the Squaire with the nine-storey parking structure. On a length of about 300 metres the so-called MiniMetro system with its two cabins can carry up to 1,300 passengers per hour. The constructor of the system was the Italian manufacturer Leitner.

The fourth runway
Plans to build a fourth runway at Frankfurt Airport were underway in 1997, but owing to violent conflicts with the concept Fraport let residents' groups and environmentalists participate in the process to find a mutually acceptable solution. In 2000, a task force presented their conclusion which generally approved a new runway, but of shorter length (only 2.8 kilometres compared to the other three 4-kilometre-long runways), which would serve as a landing-only runway for smaller aircraft. Additional requirements included improved noise protection arrangements and a strict ban on night flights between 11 pm and 5 am across the whole airport. In 2001, Fraport applied for approval to build the new runway, with three possible options. The conclusion was that a runway north-west of the airport site would have the least impact on local residents and the surrounding environment. The plans were approved by the Hessian government in December 2007, but the requested ban on night flights was lifted because it was argued that an international airport like Frankfurt would need night flights, especially for worldwide freight transport.

In 2012, the website Airport Watch reports weekly protests have been occurring at the airport since the opening of a fourth runway a year previously.

Developments since 2011
The new runway officially went into operation on 20 October 2011, with an aircraft carrying Chancellor Angela Merkel, performing the first landing on 21 October. This allows simultaneous instrument landing system (ILS) operations on these two runways, which has not been possible on the other parallel runways, which do not meet the  minimum separation for ILS operations. This allowed the airport to increase its capacity from 83 to 126 aircraft movements per hour.

On 11 October 2011, the Hessian Administration Court ruled that night flights between 11pm and 5am (the so-called Mediationsnacht) are no longer allowed at Frankfurt Airport after the inauguration of the new runway, and therefore overrode the approval from the Hessian government from 2007 which allowed 17 scheduled flights per night. On 4 April 2012, the German Administrative Court confirmed the decision of the Hessian Administration Court, banning night flights between 11pm and 5am.

To handle the predicted passenger amount of about 90 million in 2020, a new terminal section adjacent to Terminal 1 for an additional six million passengers opened on 10 October 2012. It is called Flugsteig A-Plus and exclusively used by Lufthansa mainly for their long-haul flights. Flugsteig A-Plus features eight parking positions that are able to handle four Airbus A380s or seven Boeing 747-8/747-400 at once.

In November 2016, Ryanair announced the opening of a new base at Frankfurt Airport with four routes to Spain and Portugal. This move by Ryanair was heavily blasted, especially by Lufthansa, as Ryanair was granted high discounts and incentives regarding the airport's fees. On 28 February 2017, Ryanair announced its winter programme for Frankfurt which will see a further 20 new routes being added.

2011 shooting
Albanian citizen, Arid Uka, a 21 year old at the time, targeted a United States Air Force bus parked outside the terminal building that was supposed to transport fifteen U.S. airmen to Ramstein Air Base. He reportedly walked up to a waiting airman, asked him for a cigarette, and wanted to know whether the airmen were bound for Afghanistan. When the airman said yes, according to German prosecutor Rainer Griesbaum, Uka waited for the airman to turn away and then shot him in the back of the head, killing him. Shouting "Allahu Akbar!" the attacker then entered the bus, shooting and killing the driver, and continued to fire three shots at two other airmen, wounding them. When he pointed his pistol at the head of another airman and pulled the trigger, the weapon jammed. Uka fled, but was pursued by the civilian airport employee Lamar Joseph Conner and Staff Sergeant Trevor Donald Brewer and shortly afterwards overpowered by two German police officers. He was subsequently arrested. Conner and Brewer later received the Order of Merit of the Federal Republic of Germany in a ceremony on 16 January 2012. Federal Interior Minister Hans-Peter Friedrich presented the decoration, citing their "exemplary courage and action which helped the Federal Police arrest the suspect". Uka was sentenced to Life and will be deported.

COVID-19 pandemic 
Portions of the airport were closed in early 2020 due to the COVID-19 pandemic. The Northwest Runway and Runway 18 West were closed on March 23 and re-purposed for parking unused aircraft. Terminal 2 was also closed, and all passenger operations were concentrated in Terminal 1. The Northwest Runway re-opened in July to handle summer tourist demand, while Runway 18 West remained closed. With almost no passenger traffic in the spring months, Frankfurt's total passenger volume in 2020 fell to 18.8 million, the lowest figure recorded since 1984.

Facilities

Terminals
Frankfurt Airport has two large main passenger terminals (1 and 2) and a much smaller dedicated First Class Terminal which is operated and exclusively used by Lufthansa. As is the case at London–Heathrow, Tokyo–Narita, Toronto–Pearson and Chicago–O'Hare's future Global Terminal, terminal operations are grouped for airlines and airline alliances rather than into domestic and international routes.

Terminal 1
Terminal 1 is the older and larger one of the two passenger terminals. The landside is 420 metres long. It has been enlarged several times and is divided into concourses A, B, C and Z and has a capacity of approximately 50 million passengers per year. Terminal 1 is functionally divided into three levels, the departures level on the upper floor with check-in counters, the arrivals level with baggage claim areas on the ground floor and, underneath, a distribution floor with access to the regional station and underground and multilevel parking. Departures and arrivals levels each have separate street approaches. A bus station is located at arrivals level. Terminal 1 has a total of 103 gates, which include 54 gates equipped with jetways (25 in Concourse A, 18 in Concourse B, 11 in Concourse C). Concourse Z sits on top of Concourse A sharing the same jet bridges between both concourses. Flights to non-Schengen destinations depart from the Z gates and Schengen flights depart from the A gates.

Pier A was extended by 500 metres in 2000, and a link between Terminal 1 and Terminal 2, as well as the Hall C extension opened in 2008.

On 10 October 2012, an 800-metre-long westward expansion of Terminal 1 called Pier A-Plus went into operation. It provides more stands for wide-body aircraft like the Airbus A380.

Terminal 1 is primarily used by Lufthansa, its associated companies (Brussels Airlines, Eurowings, Swiss International Air Lines and Austrian Airlines) and its Star Alliance partners (e.g. Aegean Airlines, Air Canada, Air China, Air India, All Nippon Airways, Asiana Airlines, Croatia Airlines, Egyptair, Ethiopian Airlines, LOT Polish Airlines, Scandinavian Airlines, Singapore Airlines, South African Airways, TAP Air Portugal, Thai Airways International, Turkish Airlines and United Airlines).

Some airlines that are not part of the Lufthansa Group or Star Alliance also use Terminal 1. They include Air Malta, Bulgaria Air, Iran Air, Oman Air and Tunisair among others.

SkyTeam member airline Middle East Airlines uses Terminal 1 (Concourses B and C).

Terminal 2
Terminal 2, which has a capacity of 15 million passengers a year, was opened in 1994 and is divided into concourses D and E. A continuous concourse between Terminal 1C and 2D provides direct, but non-public access between the two terminals. It has eight gates with jetways and 34 apron stands, a total of 42 gates and is able to handle wide-body aircraft such as the Airbus A380.

Terminal 2 is primarily used by airlines of the oneworld (e.g. American Airlines, British Airways, Cathay Pacific, Finnair, Iberia, Japan Airlines, Qatar Airways, Royal Air Maroc, Royal Jordanian and S7 Airlines (suspended)) and SkyTeam alliances (e.g. Aeroflot (currently suspended), Air France, China Airlines, China Eastern Airlines, Czech Airlines, Delta Air Lines, KLM, Korean Air, Saudia, TAROM and Vietnam Airlines; SkyTeam member Middle East Airlines operates out of Terminal 1, in concourses B and C).

Terminal 2 is also used by airlines that do not belong to any of the three major airline alliances, including Air Moldova, Air Serbia, China Southern Airlines, Emirates, Kuwait Airways, LATAM Airlines, and Somon Air, among others.

Fraport announced in late 2022 that Terminal 2 will be closed for refurbishment starting 2026. All tenants are to be relocated into the then fully completed Terminal 3.

Terminal overview

SkyLine
Passengers and visitors can change terminals with the people mover system SkyLine which has three stops in Terminal 1 (at gates AZ, B and C) as well as one in Terminal 2 for all gates. Some stops can only be used by passengers in or outside the Schengen zone which is achieved by separated cars and station entrances. The travel time between the terminals is 2 minutes with trains arriving every 2–3 minutes during the day. Each train has two cars, one airside (outside the Schengen area) and one landside (within the Schengen area). Most stations have a platform on each side of the train, so landside passengers can only step out onto the landside platform, and airside passengers can only step out onto the airside platform. Additionally there is regular bus service between the terminals.

Runways
Frankfurt Airport has four runways of which three are arranged parallel in east–west direction and one in north–south direction. In 2010 three runways (Runways North, South and West) handled 464,432 aircraft movements, which equated to 83 movements per hour. With the start of operation of the Northwest Runway in October 2011 the airport was predicted to be able to handle 126 movements per hour. It is predicted that aircraft movements will increase up to 700,000 in the year 2020. Simultaneous parallel landings were not possible with the north and south runway pairing, because the separation distance did not meet the safety standards.

During normal operation the two outer parallel runways (07L/25R and 07R/25L) are used for landings and the central parallel runway (07C/25C) and the Runway West (18) for take-offs. The three parallel runways have two markings because they can be operated in two directions while the Runway West can only be used in one direction.

Future expansions

Terminal 3 (under construction)
In 2009, the German government decided to create third terminals for both Frankfurt Airport and Munich Airport in order to handle expected passenger flows of 90 million in Frankfurt by 2020 and 50 million in Munich by 2017. The new terminal is scheduled to be built by Fraport, south of the existing terminals on the grounds of the former Rhein-Main Air Base. The new Terminal 3 is to accommodate up to 25 million passengers and will feature 75 new aircraft positions when completely constructed. An extension of the SkyLine people mover system is planned to connect the new terminal to Terminals 1 and 2 and the airport train stations.

In August 2014, the city of Frankfurt granted building permission for the first phase of Terminal 3. The groundbreaking for the new terminal took place on 5 October 2015. Its first phase, consisting of the main building and two of the planned four piers (concourses 3H and 3J), is planned to open by 2026 and will be able to handle 15 million additional passengers per year. Total costs are estimated at 3 billion euros.

In 2017, Frankfurt Airport first indicated that the second-phase construction of the easternmost pier (concourse 3G) could be moved forward so that low-cost carriers can use this pier from 2021. After approval by municipal authorities in 2018, the piers will be constructed and used according to the following timetable:
Due to the COVID-19 pandemic, Fraport postponed the opening of the new terminal to 2026 in March 2021.

Concourse 3G (easternmost pier):
 Construction of first twelve bus gates, reachable via shuttle buses from terminals 1/2, in use by 2021
 Construction of additional twelve bus gates by 2023/2024
 Construction of passenger jet bridges by 2025/2026

Check-in area, concourses 3H and 3J (central piers): Construction by 2023 including transport systems for visitors, passengers and luggage to the other terminals
 Concourse 3H is planned for Schengen flights
 Concourse 3J is planned for non-Schengen flights

Concourse 3K (westernmost pier): Possible third-phase expansion depending on development of passenger numbers

Passenger Transport System
A new passenger transport system is planned for the connection of the new terminal 3 and the existing terminals 1 and 2. It will use a track which is separate from the existing SkyLine people mover but will allow for interchanges between them. It is scheduled to have four stops in the final stage near the airport's two railway stations, at Terminals 1C and 2DE as well as the new Terminal 3.

Airlines and destinations

Passenger
Lufthansa and their Star Alliance partners account for the majority of all traffic at Frankfurt Airport. The following airlines offer year-round and seasonal scheduled and charter flights at Frankfurt Airport:

Cargo

Other facilities

CargoCity
Frankfurt Airport is the second-largest multimodal transport airport in Europe and has several logistics facilities. These facilities are grouped at two areas at the airport ground: In the north (CargoCity Nord) and in the south (CargoCity Süd). In 2010 it was the second-busiest airport by cargo traffic in Europe after Paris–Charles de Gaulle Airport, handling 2,231,348 metric tonnes of loaded and unloaded freight. CargoCity is the name of the two large main areas featuring most of the airport's freight handling facilities:

 The 98 hectare large CargoCity Süd (South) is home to a cargo centre for dispatch service providers and freight forwarding businesses. Several transport companies like DHL Global Forwarding, Air China, LUG Aircargo Handling (Emirates, Japan Airlines, Korean Air, Cargolux Airlines, Aegean Airlines, Delta Air Lines, Siberian Airlines, South African Airways, Uzbekistan Airways) and Fraport Cargo Services are based here.
 CargoCity Nord (North) is the headquarters of Lufthansa Cargo. Additional facilities here are a Perishables Centre for fresh produced goods and the Frankfurt Animal Lounge for the transport of living animals.

Airport City
The airport ground and the surrounding area of Frankfurt Airport offer a large variety of on-airport businesses as well as airport-related businesses, including office space, hotels, shopping areas, conference rooms and car parks. The development of an airport city has significantly accelerated in recent years.

Frankfurt Airport Centres

The Frankfurt Airport Centre 1 (FAC 1) near Terminal 1 offers office and conference facilities, the newer FAC 2 is located within Terminal 2 and offers office space for airlines.

Airport City Mall
The Airport City Mall is located on the landside of Terminal 1, departure hall B. It offers national and international retailers and label stores, a supermarket and several restaurants.

The Squaire

It is directly connected to Terminal 1 through a connecting corridor for pedestrians. The accounting firm KPMG, Lufthansa and two Hilton Hotels (Hilton Garden Inn Frankfurt Airport  with 334 rooms and Hilton Frankfurt Airport with 249 rooms) occupy space in The Squaire.

Main Airport Centre
It is located at the edge of the Frankfurt City Forest near Terminal 2.

Sheraton Hotel & Conference Centre
Sheraton Hotels and Resorts offers 1,008 guest rooms adjacent to Terminal 1 and a conference centre for up to 200 delegates.

Gateway Gardens
Gateway Gardens is a former housing area for the US Air Force personnel based at the Rhein-Main Air Base, close to Terminal 2. Like the air base, the housing area was closed in 2005. Since then the area is being developed into a business location for airport-related companies. Lufthansa moved its airline catering subsidiary LSG Sky Chefs to Gateway Gardens, Condor and SunExpress are headquartered here.

In December 2019, local trains were re-routed to run via Gateway Gardens station. The new stop for S-Bahn trains is located between Frankfurt Airport Regional Station and Frankfurt-Stadion station. The journey time will increase by 4 minutes but Deutsche Bahn have stated that they will use new trains (ET423) which will be faster and have more capacity.

Further users

 Fraport's facilities are on the property of Frankfurt Airport. Its head office building is by Gate 3. The newly constructed headquarters were inaugurated there in 2012. The Fraport Driving School (Fraport Fahrschule) is in Building 501 of CargoCity South (CargoCity Süd).
 Lufthansa's main building, where the board of directors is seated, is called Lufthansa Aviation Centre (LAC). Lufthansa operates the Lufthansa Aviation Center (LAC), Building 366 at Frankfurt Airport. Several company departments, including Corporate Communications, Investor Relations, and Media Relations, are based at the LAC. Lufthansa also uses several other buildings in the area, including the Lufthansa Flight Training Center for flight training operations and the Lufthansa Basis BG2 as a central base and for crew briefing. As of 2011 Lufthansa Cargo has been headquartered in Building 451 of the Frankfurt Airport area. As of 2012 Lufthansa Cargo is located at Gate 25 in the CargoCity Nord area, Lufthansa Technik is located at Gate 23 and in the CargoCity Süd area.
 Star Alliance, an airline alliance, has its headquarters at the Frankfurt Airport Centre 1 (FAC 1) adjacent to Terminal 1.
 Airmail Centre Frankfurt, a joint venture of Lufthansa Cargo, Fraport, and Deutsche Post for airmail transport, has its head office in Building 189, between Terminals 1 and 2.
 Aero Lloyd previously had its head office in Building 182.

Statistics

Annual traffic

Route statistics

Ground transport
Frankfurt Airport can easily be accessed by car, taxi, train or bus as it features an extensive transport network. There are two railway stations at the airport: one for suburban/regional trains and one for long-distance trains.

Rail

Regional station

Frankfurt Airport regional station (Frankfurt Flughafen Regionalbahnhof) at Terminal 1, concourse B, provides access to the S-Bahn commuter rail lines S8 and S9. Each of these lines have trains departing every 15 minutes during daytime to Hanau Central Station eastwards via Frankfurt Central Station and Offenbach East Station or Wiesbaden Central Station westwards via Rüsselsheim or Mainz Central Station (line S8) or Mainz-Kastel Station (line S9).

The journey time to Frankfurt Central Station is 10–12 minutes.

Regional Express (RE) trains to Saarbrücken, Koblenz or Würzburg call at this station. These trains provide less frequent but additional connections between Frankfurt Airport and the Central Station.

Long-distance station

Frankfurt Airport long-distance station (Frankfurt Flughafen Fernbahnhof) was opened in 1999. The station is squeezed in between the motorway A 3 and the four-lane Bundesstraße B43, linked to Terminal 1 by a connecting corridor for pedestrians that bridges the Autobahn. About 10 trains per hour depart in all directions.

Deutsche Bahn operates the AIRail Service in conjunction with Lufthansa, American Airlines and Emirates. The service operates to the central stations of Bonn, Cologne, Düsseldorf, Freiburg, Karlsruhe, Leipzig, Hamburg, Hannover, Mannheim, Munich, Nuremberg, Stuttgart and to Kassel-Wilhelmshöhe.

Car
Frankfurt Airport is located in the Frankfurt City Forest and directly connected to an Autobahn intersection called Frankfurter Kreuz where the A3 and A5 meet. It takes a 10–15 minutes by car or taxi to get to Frankfurt Central Station or the centre of the city.

Passengers driving their own cars can park in multilevel parking garages (mostly underground) along the terminals. A long term holiday parking lot is located south of the runways and connected by shuttle bus to the terminals.

Bicycle
Terminal 1 and Terminal 2 can be reached by bicycle because one of the roads that run north of the airport passing the terminals can legally be used by bicycle. The airport authority has confirmed that the newly built terminal 3 will also be reachable by bicycle.

Bus and coaches
Various transport companies provide bus services to the airport from the surrounding areas as well as by coach to long-distance destinations.

Previously All Nippon Airways operated a bus service to Düsseldorf exclusively for ANA customers; that way Düsseldorf passengers would be transported to Frankfurt Airport to board their ANA flights. In 2014 ANA established a separate flight from Tokyo to Düsseldorf, causing the bus services to end.

Ground transport statistics
In 2006, 29.5% of the 12,299,192 passengers whose air travel originated in Frankfurt came by private car, 27.9% came by rail, 20.4% by taxi, 11.1% parked their car at the airport for the duration of their trip, 5.3% came by bus, and 4.6% arrived with a rental car.

Incidents and accidents
 On 4 January 1938, a Deutsche Lufthansa Junkers Ju-52 crashed in a snowstorm on approach to FRA due to icing. All three crew and three passengers were killed.
 On 29 September 1938, a Luftwaffe Junkers Ju-52 crashed due to a preliminary ground contact caused by a wrong estimation of height. One occupant of the four on board were killed.
 On 22 March 1952, a KLM Royal Dutch Airlines Douglas DC-6  on a return flight from Johannesburg to Amsterdam crashed 7 km NE of FRA into a forest. Nine crew and 36 passengers of the 47 total on board perished.
 On 14 October 1953, a Sabena Convair CV-240 crashed near Kelstenbach shortly after takeoff following loss of engine power 1 km N of FRA. All four crew and 40 passengers died.
 On 21 January 1967, an Air Ferry Douglas C-54, a cargo flight, struck trees some 2700 metres short of the runway while on a night-time instrument landing system approach. Both occupants were killed.
 On 24 November 1972, an Air Canada McDonnell Douglas DC-8 bound for Montreal, Canada was hijacked on the ground at FRA and a hijacker demanded a release of prisoners. The plane was stormed and the hijacker arrested. One person died.
 On 22 May 1983, during an air show at Rhein-Main Air Base, a Canadian RCAF Lockheed F-104 Starfighter crashed into a nearby road, hitting a car and killing all passengers, a vicar's family of five. The pilot was able to eject.
 On 19 June 1985, a bomb cloaked in a canvas bag was detonated approx at 14:42 in the afternoon in Hall B of the Rhein Main Frankfurt Airport, decimating that section of the airport. The blast resulted in three deaths and 32 injuries, of which four were considered serious.
In May 1999, a violent illegal immigrant was being deported by police, from Frankfurt to Cairo. He was restrained before the flight took off and when an officer attempted to talk to him later, he found that he was no longer alive.
 In September 2007, German authorities arrested three suspected terrorists for plotting a "massive" terror attack, which posed "an imminent threat" to Frankfurt Airport and the US Air Force base in Ramstein.
 On 2 March 2011, a gunman opened fire on a bus carrying US Air Force personnel at Frankfurt Airport, killing two and wounding two others.
 On 11 June 2018, Lufthansa Flight 426, an Airbus A340, preparing for a flight to Philadelphia International Airport sustained damage on pushback from the gate, the tow tug caught fire and the aircraft sustained damage to the nose and cockpit section. Ten airport staff, consisting of ground crew and emergency responders, suffered minor injuries as a result of smoke inhalation. The aircraft was written off.

In media
Frankfurt Airport is featured in the Discovery Channel series X-Ray Mega Airport (also known as Inside Frankfurt Airport).

Jinder Mahal pinned R-Truth at the Frankfurt Airport for the 24/7 Championship. This title change was shown on WWE.com and WWE's official social media accounts.

See also

 Horst Julius Freiherr Treusch von Buttlar-Brandenfels
 Deutsche Zeppelin Reederei
 List of airports in Germany
 List of busiest airports by cargo traffic
 List of busiest airports by international passenger traffic
 List of the busiest airports in Germany
 Transport in Germany

References

External links

 Official website
 
 

Airports in Hesse
Airports established in 1936
Transport in Frankfurt